The Twenty-second Oklahoma Legislature was a meeting of the legislative branch of the government of Oklahoma, composed of the Oklahoma Senate and the Oklahoma House of Representatives. The state legislature met in regular session at the Oklahoma State Capitol in Oklahoma City from January 4, 1949, to May 27, 1949; and in special session for 17 days in November and December 1949, during the term of Governor Roy J. Turner.

Dates of session
Regular session: January 4, 1949 – May 27, 1949
Special session: November–December 1949
Previous: 21st Legislature • Next: 23rd Legislature

Party composition

Senate

House of Representatives

Leadership

Senate
Senate President Pro Tem: Bill Logan.

House of Representatives
Speaker: Walter Billingsley
Speaker Pro Tempore: John W. Russell Jr.
Majority Floor Leader: Joe A. Smalley
Chief Clerk: Thomas P. Holt

Members

Senate

Table based on 2005 Oklahoma Almanac.

House of Representatives

Table based on government database.

References

External links
Oklahoma Senate
Oklahoma House of Representatives

Oklahoma legislative sessions
1949 in Oklahoma
1950 in Oklahoma
1949 U.S. legislative sessions
1950 U.S. legislative sessions